Arduino Cantafora (born November 8, 1945, in Milan), Italian-Swiss architect, painter, and writer. He was the student of Aldo Rossi

Biography 
Graduated at the Politecnico di Milano, he became renowned for his paintings with Renaissance influence, inspired by Giorgio de Chirico. He became acquainted with Aldo Rossi, of whom he was a pupil.

In the 1990s, he designed scenery for operas: Perseus and Andromeda at La Scala (1991) and Mozart's Don Giovanni in Aix-en-Provence (1993).

He has taught at Yale University, IUAV, Accademia di Architettura di Mendrisio, and the Swiss Federal Institute of Technology in Lausanne (EPFL).

He is naturalized as a Swiss citizen.

Publications 
 Quindici stanze per una casa (1988)
 La pomme d'Adrien (2002)
 Le stanze della vita (2004)
 L'architecture du corps (2006, with Charles Duboux)

Notes and references

External links
 

1945 births
Living people
Artists from Milan
Polytechnic University of Milan alumni
Architects from Milan
20th-century Italian painters
Italian male painters
21st-century Italian painters
Yale University faculty
Italian expatriates in Switzerland
Swiss architects
Italian scenic designers
Italian male writers
Theatre people from Milan
20th-century Italian male artists
21st-century Italian male artists